"Soon You'll Get Better" is a song recorded by the American singer-songwriter Taylor Swift for her seventh studio album, Lover (2019), which was released on August 23, 2019, through Republic Records. Featuring background vocals from the Chicks, the song is the twelfth track on the album, and was written and produced by Swift and Jack Antonoff. "Soon You'll Get Better" has been described as a husky country ballad and has been compared to "The Best Day", a song from Swift's second studio album Fearless (2008), in both style and in subject matter; both focus on Swift's relationship with her mother. 

"Soon You'll Get Better" received widespread acclaim from music critics, who praised the vulnerable songwriting and Swift's emotional vocal performance. The tone of the song has been compared to prayers and lullabies. Upon the album's release, "Soon You'll Get Better" debuted at number 63 on the Billboard Hot 100, and became a top-ten hit on the Billboard Hot Country Songs chart; the song became the Chicks' first entry on the chart in thirteen years. On April 18, 2020, Swift performed a solo piano rendition of the song as part of the One World: Together at Home livestream charity event; the performance received universal acclaim from music and television critics.

Background and composition 

The song is about the battles Swift's parents have had with cancer, and specifically on her mother's latest diagnosis. In a live video broadcast on YouTube the day before the album's release, Swift told fans that the song was the hardest on the album to write, adding that the choice to publish it was made in a family discussion because of how personal it is. Fans who were invited to Swift's Secret Sessions have reported that she left the room when the song played. "Soon You'll Get Better" is a country ballad. Rolling Stone call it "stripped-down", noting that the only music in the acoustic song is provided by sparse strings, with Time favorably describing the track as a "tilt back to [Swift's] country roots" and USA Today saying it has a "Nashville feel". The song features the American country trio The Chicks; a picture of the band was featured as an easter egg in the music video for the album's lead single, "Me!". Swift previously performed with the Chicks shortly after her mother's first cancer diagnosis, and has cited the band's fifth studio album, Fly (1999), as an influence on the aesthetic of Lover.

In a July 2020 interview with Billboard, the Chicks admitted that collaborating with Swift "felt like a lot of pressure", wondering "what if we don't like this song? How are we going to say no to Taylor Swift?"; however the trio liked the song and recorded their backing vocals. Natalie Maines stated that Swift is showing "that vulnerable place of figuring this shit out for herself", while Emily Strayer added that "the power she [Swift] has right now to change things is way beyond any power we [the Chicks] ever had. She's in a different position than we ever were."

Time's Raisa Bruner has described "Soon You'll Get Better" as a "sweet country lullaby" and an "acoustic ballad about illness and hoping for health", and added that "ultimately the song is a kind of prayer". Bruner expanded that Swift's repetition of the song title "functions more as a plea than a proclamation, an uncertainty that the song's delicacy echoes". Vulture's Jewly Height noted that Swift's vocal delivery, in the song, is "hushed as she steers the perspective like a cinematographer — first the focus on a tiny detail ("coat buttons tangled in her hair"), then a zoomed-out shot of the settings where the trouble's playing out ("doctors’ offices and hospital rooms")".

Critical reception 
"Soon You'll Get Better" received widespread critical acclaim, often being noted as a highlight from Lover, with critics praising Swift's "sincere" vocal performance, the "vulnerable" songwriting and the acoustic instrumentation of the song. 
 
Time has called the song "heart-wrenching", with Rolling Stone saying that it contains the "most vulnerable lyrics Swift has written in her entire career". USA Today said that it ranked among her saddest songs, referring to her previous charity single "Ronan", also about cancer. Rolling Stone complimented that lack of powerful instruments allowed Swift's personal memories to be the focus on the song, with the Chicks' background vocals serving this further and echoing the internal struggle the lyrics indicate. USA Today said that there was no better song on the album for the collaboration. The Guardian referred to the track as "a gorgeous, hushed country ballad about [Swift's] mother's illness, bedecked with banjo, fiddle and backing vocals by The Chicks" perfect for "those who think it all went wrong when she left Nashville" to "console themselves with". Vulture referred to the song as a "fingerpicked throwback" with Swift's singing exhibiting "breathiness, crisp enunciation, and telegraphed sincerity". They added that Swift's solo verses repeat a "modest, wilting pattern with each line over a soft bed of acoustic guitar" and that "the sound gets only slightly bigger at the first chorus, with the introduction of the Chicks' brightening harmonies, gingerly picked banjo, and lyrical fiddle accents".

The New York Times appreciated the "jolting specificity" of Swift's songwriting while stating that the "agonized" harmonies from [the] Chicks serve as an "empathetic swaddle". Pitchfork called the song a "heart-rending" ballad. The Spinoff opined that the song showcases the growth of Swift's vocal delivery and termed it as "beautiful stuff", while lauding [the] Chicks harmonies as "literal angels coming around Swift as she grieves her mother's cancer". The Irish Times  referred to the song as a "delicate letter to her mother", portraying "the fear and the silence of a hospital room". Consequence of Sound wrote that the song has "the most heavenly harmonies of her [Swift's] career". Saving Country Music was complimentary to the track and especially Swift's songwriting; though establishing their review within the context of Swift's long-since departure from the genre of country and their general distaste towards her "vapid" output, they say that "[Swift could] release it to country radio [...] and it would immediately become one of the most country-sounding singles on the format".

Entertainment Weekly named "Soon You'll Get Better" as one of the ten "most emotionally devastating" songs of the 2010s decade and stated that the "heartbreaking" lyrics showcase Swift's pain and worry effectively. They also labelled the bridge of the song as "the saddest" bridge in Swift's discography.

Commercial performance
Upon the release of Lover, "Soon You'll Get Better" debuted at number 63 on the Billboard Hot 100 with 10.3 million US streams and 9,000 downloads sold. It was the Chicks' first entry on the Hot 100 since "Not Ready to Make Nice" (2007). The song also debuted at number 10 on the Billboard Hot Country Songs, becoming Swift's twenty-first top-10 entry and her first since Sugarland's "Babe" (2018). For the Chicks, it was their first appearance on the chart since 2006, when "Everybody Knows" peaked at number 45.

In the United States, spurred by Swift's debut performance of the song as part of the One World: Together At Home live television event, "Soon You'll Get Better" was among the top three sellers from the show, along with Maluma's "Carnaval" and Kacey Musgraves' "Rainbow"; these three songs together accounted for 42% of the total song sales generated by the show. "Soon You'll Get Better" sold more than 1000 downloads on April 18, 2020, compared to negligible sales the day before.

Live performance 
On April 18, 2020, Swift performed a solo piano rendition of "Soon You'll Get Better" as part of the Lady Gaga-curated One World: Together At Home television special, a benefit event by Global Citizen to raise funds for the World Health Organization's COVID-19 Solidarity Response Fund. Swift performed the song despite previously stating that she would not perform it, because of how "difficult" it is for her to "emotionally deal" with its meaning. 

The performance received widespread acclaim from television critics. HuffPost named Swift's performance as the number-one key moment of Together At Home, by stating that Swift moved "us to tears with her stunning performance", and added that the track is a "somber recollection of Taylor's feelings during her mother's battle with cancer, so it's already a heart-wrenching listen, but took on another meaning in the current climate, when so many thousands of people have lost their lives due to COVID-19". Naming the performance as one of the 10 best moments of the event, Billboard commended that Swift "effectively ripped our hearts out and reminded us of the power of music to both reflect and ease our pain. It was a tough, lovely and cathartic moment".

Mashable, Radio Times and Vogue also named the performance as one of the best moments of the event. Variety lauded Swift for her song choice, and described: "It was up to Swift—not usually thought of as a bracingly downbeat figure—who emerged as sober truth-teller at nearly the last minute, appearing alone, mirrored by her piano top, to perform a song she may be unlikely to sing under any other circumstance outside the studio". It further expanded that, "with verses so distraught they threaten to betray the deceptively optimist title as magical thinking", "there couldn't have been a more appropriate song for all the families of ICU patients sitting at home. The upturn in Swift's mouth as she wrapped up her appearance was measured in micro-millimeters, as it should be".

Credits and personnel 
Credits adapted from Tidal.

 Taylor Swift – vocals, songwriter, producer
 Jack Antonoff – producer, songwriter, acoustic guitar, keyboards, piano, recording engineer
 The Chicks – featured vocals, backing vocals
 Emily Strayer – banjo
 Martie Maguire – fiddle
 Laura Sisk  – recording engineer
 John Rooney – assistant recording engineer
 John Hanes – mix engineer
 Serban Ghenea – mixer

Charts

References 

2019 songs
2010s ballads
Taylor Swift songs
The Chicks songs
Songs written by Taylor Swift
Songs written by Jack Antonoff
Song recordings produced by Jack Antonoff
Songs about diseases and disorders
Country ballads
Song recordings produced by Taylor Swift
Vocal collaborations
Songs about cancer